Sumitomo Precision Products Co., Ltd.  is an integrated manufacturer of aerospace equipment, heat exchangers, hydraulic controls, wireless sensor networks, sensors, micro-electronics technology, and environmental systems. The aerospace division supplies its products to aerospace industries worldwide, including Boeing, Airbus, Bombardier, and Embraer.

History
Formerly a division of Sumitomo Metal Industries, the aerospace business was spun off as Sumitomo Precision Products in 1961.

Products & Services
 Landing gear
 Aircraft propellers
 Jet-engine coolers
 Heat exchangers (for LNG, etc.)
 Hydraulic actuators
 Microelectromechanical systems and semiconductor production equipment
 Wireless Sensor Networks
 Foundry
 MEMS sensors
 Ozonizers

External links
Official Site
Silicon Sensing Systems
SPP Technologies Co., Ltd.
SPP Canada Aircraft, Inc.(SPPCA)
Sumitomo Precision USA, Inc

Companies listed on the Tokyo Stock Exchange
Companies listed on the Osaka Exchange
Manufacturing companies of Japan
Aircraft component manufacturers
Technology companies established in 1961
Sumitomo Group
Companies based in Osaka Prefecture
Japanese companies established in 1961